The Chaminade Silverswords are the 10 varsity athletic teams that represent Chaminade University of Honolulu, located in Honolulu, Hawaii, in NCAA Division II intercollegiate sports. The Silverswords compete as members of the Pacific West Conference. Chaminade University of Honolulu's team name is the "Silverswords," a reference to a Hawaiian plant prized for its beauty and ability to withstand harsh conditions.

Varsity sports

Teams

Men's sports
 Basketball
 Cross Country
 Golf
 Soccer

Women's sports
 Basketball
 Cross Country
 Soccer
 Softball
 Tennis
 Volleyball

Historic moments 
In 1982, Chaminade, then a member of the NAIA, defeated Virginia in what was considered the biggest upset in college basketball history up to that point. Virginia, which featured Ralph Sampson and Rick Carlisle, was the top-ranked team in NCAA Division I basketball entering the game after posting victories against Georgetown (with Patrick Ewing) and Phi Slama Jama of Houston. But in the Blaisdell Arena, the 3,500 fans in attendance, most of whom had come to see the nation's No. 1 team, witnessed the historic 77–72 upset. Many newspapers reportedly checked sources several times to make sure the story was right—that 800-student NAIA Chaminade had actually defeated the NCAA's top-ranked Cavaliers.

The Maui Invitational Tournament, hosted by Chaminade, began in 1984, partly due to the Silverswords' 1982 win over Virginia.

Maui Invitational
Chaminade hosts a major annual early-season tournament in NCAA Division I men's basketball: the Maui Invitational Tournament. The Silverswords are the only Division II team that plays in the Maui Invitational. However, since 2018, the Silverswords only appear in the tournament in odd-numbered years. In even-numbered years, Chaminade plays two games at tournament participants' home arenas. 

In the 2012 invitational, Chaminade defeated the Texas Longhorns in the opening round by a score of 86–73. It was the second career loss to Chaminade for Texas coach Rick Barnes, who previously lost in 1991 as the coach of the Providence Friars.  the Silverswords' record in the tournament is 8–92 after a 24-point win over California.

Notable staff

Al Walker (born 1959), former basketball player and college coach, now a scout for the Detroit Pistons of the NBA

References

External links